Frederick William Lucas (30 January 1902 – 17 September 1957) was a New Zealand rugby union player. A three-quarter, Lucas represented Auckland at a provincial level, and was a member of the New Zealand national side, the All Blacks, from 1923 to 1930. He played 41 matches for the All Blacks including seven internationals. In the 1930s he coached Ponsonby and was a selector for the Auckland (1938–46), North Island (1939–46) and New Zealand (1945–46) teams. He was also a surf lifesaver, representing Piha at the New Zealand championships.

References

External links
 Photograph of Fred Lucas. Crown Studios Ltd: negatives and prints. Ref 1/2-204818-F. Alexander Turnbull Library, Wellington, New Zealand.

1902 births
1957 deaths
Rugby union players from Auckland
New Zealand rugby union players
New Zealand international rugby union players
Auckland rugby union players
New Zealand rugby union coaches
New Zealand sports executives and administrators
New Zealand surf lifesavers
New Zealand sportsmen